Serem is a village in the Meriç District of Edirne Province in Turkey.Serem isa

References

Villages in Meriç District